James Thorne may refer to:

 James Thorne (preacher) (1795–1872), English Methodist preacher and editor
 James Thorne (footballer) (born 1996), English professional footballer
 James Thorne (antiquary), English antiquary